Alternatives: Global, Local, Political is a peer-reviewed academic journal that covers the field of international relations. The journal's editor-in-chief is Lacin Idil Oztig (Yıldız Technical University). It has been in publication since 1975 and is published by SAGE Publications in association with the Centre for the Study of Developing Societies.

Abstracting and indexing
The journal is abstracted and indexed in Scopus and the Social Sciences Citation Index. According to the Journal Citation Reports, its 2020 impact factor is 1.095.

Controversy
In 2020, the journal published a controversial journal article claiming that "International Relations (IR) scholars uncritically accept the official narrative regarding the events of 9/11 and refuse to examine the massive body of evidence generated by the 9/11 truth movement." A number of scholars reacted on social media to criticize the claims made in the abstract, the editor's decision to publish, and the editorial board's silence. In a public statement addressing this controversy, the editor of Alternatives defended the publication of the article on free speech grounds.

References

External links

SAGE Publishing academic journals
English-language journals
International relations journals